Trial on the Road is a 1971 black-and-white Soviet film set in World War II, directed by Aleksey German, starring Rolan Bykov, Anatoly Solonitsyn and Vladimir Zamansky.  It is also known as Checkpoint or Check up on the Road.

Trial on the Road was censored and taken out of circulation in the Soviet Union for 15 years after its release due to its controversial depiction of Soviet soldiers. The film is based on a story by the director's father, Yuri German. The screenplay was written by Eduard Volodarsky.

This film is Alexei German's solo directorial debut which took a philosophical approach to the Soviet usage of "heroes" and "traitors". Screenplay by A. German and Eduard Y. Volodarsky (1941-2012), the film is based on the novel of his father (Operatsiya "S Novym Godom", or Operation "Happy New Year"), Yuri German (1910-1967), a Soviet novelist, screenwriter, and journalist. The original film title was that of the novel.

Plot

The drama takes place in December 1942 during the Nazi occupation of the USSR in World War II.  
It revolves around the former Red Army sergeant Lazarev who was captured in his German uniform by Soviet partisans. Earlier he was captured by the Nazis and become a collaborator (hiwi), but after being captured by partisans he starts fighting against the Nazis.

The title of the film was based on real events: partisans used to stop a truck full of "politsais" (police made of local collaborators) or Vlasovites and shoot them all after a brief trial, leaving one to tell the story. Lazarev's character is based on a real person as well, but his real-life role was to penetrate Vlasov detachments to convince Vlasovites to give themselves up. In the film, Lazarev voluntarily gives himself up to partisans, and two partisan leaders (of antipodal characters), Commander Lokotkov and Commissar Petushkov, put the collaborator to the test. For some partisans, he will be always a traitor and treated with suspicion, but for others this former Red Army officer, by joining the group of partisans, has to prove himself on the battlefield as a patriot and hero. In the end he got killed in action distinguishing himself by bravery and heroism.

Cast 
 Rolan Bykov as Ivan Egorovich Lokotkov
 Anatoly Solonitsyn as  Igor Leonidovich Petushkov
 Vladimir Zamansky as Alexander Ivanovich Lazarev
 Oleg Borisov as  Victor Mikhailovich Solomin
 Fyodor Odinokov as  The Old Mine-Layer - Erofeich
 Anda Zaice as  Inga, the partisan-interpreter
 Gennadi Dyudyayev as  Dmitry, a young partisan
 Maya Bulgakova as a peasant woman
 Nikolai Burlyayev as  young auxiliary policeman
 Victor Pavlov as  Kutenko, an auxiliary police watchman
 Yuriy Dubrovin as Gennady Bolshakov
 Pyotr Kolbasin as episode

Release history
The "Trial on the Road" film was shot in 1971, but was banned for 15 years. It was "shelved" for the film's theme: it was harshly criticized for "deheroization of partisan movement" and for sympathy to a traitor, or collaborator with Nazi forces, but who becomes a hero in fighting against the Germans on the Soviets side. This "anti-heroic" depiction of Soviet history shows that distinctions like "traitor" and "hero" cease to have any real meaning, according to Alexei German's humane portrait of wartime. The film was released in 1987, during "perestroika" in the Soviet Union.

Awards
1988: USSR State Prize
A number of film prizes

References

External links
 
 

1971 films
1971 drama films
1971 directorial debut films
1970s war drama films
Soviet war drama films
Russian war drama films
1970s Russian-language films
Soviet black-and-white films
Eastern Front of World War II films
Films set in 1942
Films set in Russia
Films shot in Russia
Lenfilm films
Films directed by Aleksei Yuryevich German
Films based on Russian novels
Russian black-and-white films
Russian World War II films
Soviet World War II films